The Sahuarita Unified School District is the school district serving Sahuarita and Green Valley, Arizona. The district serves 5,800 students.

Campuses

Elementary and middle schools
 Sahuarita Primary (K-2)
 Sahuarita Intermediate (3-5)
 Sahuarita Middle (6-8)
 Sopori School (K-6) (originally the sole school of the now annexed Sopori Elementary School District (Pima County School District No. 49)
 Anza Trail (K-8)
 Copper View Elementary (K-5)
 Wrightson Ridge (K-8)

High schools
 Sahuarita High School
 Walden Grove High School

References

External links
 

School districts in Arizona
School districts in Pima County, Arizona
1896 establishments in Arizona Territory
School districts established in 1896